Vasa may refer to:

Places
 Vaşa, Azerbaijan
 Vasa County, a historic county in modern-day Finland
 Vaasa or Vasa, Finland
 Vasa, Rajasthan, a village in Sirohi District, Rajasthan, India
 Vasa, Palghar, a village in Maharashtra, India
 Väsa, a village in Dalarna, Sweden
 Vasa Loch, a brackish lagoon in Shapinsay, Orkney Islands, Scotland, UK
 Vasa Township, Goodhue County, Minnesota, U.S.

Other uses
 Vasa (name), a surname and given name (including a list of people with the name)
 Vasa (ship), a Swedish warship that sank in 1628
 House of Vasa, a medieval Swedish noble family, the royal house of Sweden 1523–1654 and of Poland 1587–1668
 Order of Vasa, a Swedish order of chivalry, awarded to citizens of Sweden
 Vasa Medal, a Swedish medal
 vasa gene, a gene that is essential for germ cell development
 Vasa IFK, a Finnish football club
 Vasa parrot, a genus of parrots from Madagascar
 Vasa Museum, a museum in Stockholm, Sweden

See also
 Vaasa (disambiguation)
 Wasa (disambiguation)
 Wausa, Nebraska, named after Gustav Vasa, but with a slightly different spelling